Otis O. Roberts (20 March 1842 - 8 February 1930) was a Sergeant of the United States Army who was awarded the Medal of Honor for gallantry during the American Civil War. He was awarded the medal on 28 December 1863.

Personal life 
Roberts was born on 20 March 1842 in Sangerville, Maine to parents Amos Roberts and Christiana Ryerson Roberts. He was one of three children. Roberts married three times, to Emelda J. Davis, Rosella Roberts, and Louise A. Hussey and fathered a total of four children. He died on 8 February 1930 in Dexter, Maine and was buried in Mount Pleasant Cemetery in Dexter.

Military service 
Roberts entered service in Dexter and served as a Sergeant with Company H of the 6th Maine Infantry. On 7 November 1863, at the Second Battle of Rappahannock Station, he engaged in hand-to-hand combat with the color bearer of the 8th Louisiana Infantry and was able to capture the unit's flag. For this action, he was awarded the Medal of Honor on 28 December 1863.

Roberts' Medal of Honor citation reads:

See also
 List of American Civil War Medal of Honor recipients

References 

United States Army soldiers
United States Army Medal of Honor recipients
American Civil War recipients of the Medal of Honor
1842 births
1930 deaths
People from Dexter, Maine